Gregory Jamieson Clark  (born March 7, 1971) is a Canadian politician from Alberta. He is the former leader of the Alberta Party, and in the 2015 Alberta general election was elected the party's sole Member of the Legislative Assembly, representing Calgary-Elbow. Clark resigned as leader on November 18, 2017, and served as interim leader until the leadership election when Stephen Mandel was elected the new leader of the party.

Biography
Clark was born and raised in Calgary, Alberta. He graduated in 1993 from the University of Victoria with a degree in Political Science, minoring in Sociology and holds an MBA from Royal Roads University, graduating in 2005. He returned to Alberta to work for Laurence Decore, who was then leader of the Official Opposition Alberta Liberals.

Deciding to leave politics for a time, Clark earned an MBA and in 2006 co-founded an Information Technology consulting firm C3 Associates. The firm earned a distinction as one of Alberta Venture's 50 fast growth companies in 2011 and 2012. C3 Associates was also named one of Canada's top 250 information technology companies by the Branham Group in 2012 and 2013. In 2015, Mr. Clark was named one Alberta's 50 Most Influential by Alberta Venture Magazine. He has engaged in volunteer work, most notably as Vice Chair of Distress Centre Calgary, and he co-founded the Calgary River Communities Action Group in response to the 2013 Alberta floods.

In 2013, Clark sold his share of C3 to his partners to enter politics full-time.

Political career
Clark was the Alberta Party's election candidate in Calgary-Elbow for the 2012 Alberta general election, placing 5th. Following the resignation of Glenn Taylor, the Alberta Party remained without a leader for some months. On May 29, 2013, the party announced that it would hold a leadership vote to coincide with its Annual General Meeting on September 21, 2013 in Edmonton. Clark won the election, receiving 87% of the 337 votes cast.

He was elected as the Member of the Legislative Assembly of Alberta for Calgary-Elbow on May 5, 2015. He currently serves on the Standing Committee for Resource Stewardship and is a member of the Select Special Ethics and Accountability Committee.

Despite becoming the first Alberta Party candidate to win a seat in the Alberta legislature and growing the caucus to two by attracting an NDP MLA to cross the floor, Clark resigned as leader in November 2017 after being reportedly pressured by the party's board of directors to do so in order to renew the party through a leadership election. His resignation occurred months after the merger of the Progressive Conservative and Wildrose parties in to the United Conservative Party which, in turn, resulted in large numbers of disaffected former Progressive Conservatives to join the Alberta Party and, allegedly, try to remould it in their image. Though he initially considered standing in the new leadership election, Clark announced on December 14, 2017, that he would not be a candidate for the leadership though he intends to remain an Alberta Party MLA and run for re-election to the legislature in the 2019 provincial election.

Election results

References

External links
Alberta Party

1971 births
Living people
Leaders of the Alberta Party
Alberta Party MLAs
Politicians from Calgary
21st-century Canadian politicians